The PPMP-2 is a Yugoslavian anti-personnel stake mine. The mine was not mass-produced, but was built in large quantities at a number of different locations.

The mine has a grenade-like main body with a diamond grooved fragmentation pattern, although it sometimes uses other patterns. Internally, the mine uses a stick of commercial plastic explosive
held centrally by a ring of the same type of explosive at the bottom of the main body. Additional fragmentation material is packed inside the gap between the main charge and the mine body. The mine uses a locally produced fuse similar to the Russian MUV fuse.

The use of commercial explosives as an expedient makes the mine very unstable, as the explosive may deteriorate over time.

The mine is found in Bosnia and Croatia.

Specifications
 Height: 130 mm (without fuze and stake)
 Diameter: 80 mm
 Weight: 2 kg
 Explosive content: 0.2 kg of TNT (explosive) or commercial explosives
 Operating pressure: 2 to 4 kg pull
 Fuze: UPM-1 or UPM-2A

References
 Jane's Mines and Mine Clearance 2005-2006

Anti-personnel mines
Land mines of Yugoslavia